Anne-Laure Blin (born 12 June 1983) is a French Republican politician who has been Member of Parliament for Maine-et-Loire's 3rd constituency since the 2020 by-election.

Electoral record 

 
 
 
 
 
 
|-
| colspan="8" bgcolor="#E9E9E9"|
|-

References 

1983 births
Living people
People from Toul
People from Maine-et-Loire
The Republicans (France) politicians
Deputies of the 15th National Assembly of the French Fifth Republic
Deputies of the 16th National Assembly of the French Fifth Republic
21st-century French women politicians
Women members of the National Assembly (France)
Politicians from Pays de la Loire